Pseudoscione is a genus of flies in the family Tabanidae.

Species
Pseudoscione albifrons (Macquart, 1838)
Pseudoscione dorsoguttata (Macquart, 1850)
Pseudoscione fenestrata (Macquart, 1846)
Pseudoscione flavipes (Enderlein, 1929)
Pseudoscione longipennis (Ricardo, 1902)
Pseudoscione macquarti (Guerin-Meneville, 1838)
Pseudoscione stictica (Wilkerson & Coscarón, 1984)
Pseudoscione subandina (Philippi, 1865)
Pseudoscione vittata (Philippi, 1865)

References

Tabanidae
Brachycera genera
Diptera of South America
Taxa named by Adolfo Lutz